Lukáš Žalčík (born October 15, 1990) is a Czech professional ice hockey player. He played with HC Sparta Praha in the Czech Extraliga during the 2010–11 Czech Extraliga season.

References

External links

1990 births
Czech ice hockey forwards
HC Sparta Praha players
Living people
People from Šumperk
Sportspeople from the Olomouc Region
HC Dukla Jihlava players
LHK Jestřábi Prostějov players
Motor České Budějovice players
HC Stadion Litoměřice players
HC Berounští Medvědi players
Hokej Šumperk 2003 players